Sri Govindarajaswamy Temple is an ancient Hindu Vaishnavite temple situated in the heart of Tirupati city in Tirupati district of Andhra Pradesh in India. The temple was built during 12 century and was consecrated in the year 1130 AD by Saint Ramanujacharya. The temple is one of the earliest structures in Tirupati and also one of the biggest temple complexes in Tirupati district. The Tirupati (down hill) city is built around this temple. The temple is currently administered by Tirumala Tirupati Devasthanams.

Legend
It is believed that during invasion of Govindaraja Perumal Temple in Chidambaram, the Utsava murti (processional deity) was brought to Tirupati for safe keeping. The Utsava murti was taken back after the invasions.

History
Sri Govindarajaswamy Temple was consecrated in the year 1130 AD by saint Ramanujacharya. However, there are structures inside the temple complex which belong to 9th and 10th centuries. Before Govindarajaswamy was consecrated as the presiding deity, Sri Parthasarathy Swamy was the presiding deity of the temple. Kotturu, a village at the foot of Tirumala hills, was moved to the vicinity of Sri Govindarajaswamy Temple which was later merged into city of Tirupati.

Presiding Deity
The temple is dedicated to Lord Vishnu, who is referred to as Govindarajaswamy. The deity is in reclining yoga nidra posture, facing east, with his right hand under his head and left hand straight over his body. Sridevi and Bhudevi, the consorts of Vishnu, are seated at the deity's feet. Before consecration of Govindaraja Swamy shrine, Sri Parthasarathi Swamy was the primary deity of the temple. In some texts, Govindaraja Swamy is mentioned as the elder brother of Venkateshwara (main deity). Govindaraja Swamy temple also has shrines of Padmavati Devi, Ramanuja Swamy (Saint Ramanuja) and Andal near the entrance. There is a structure housing the Vishnu Avatars to the right side of the entrance as like common in  other Vishnu temples.

Architecture
The temple is one of the huge temple complexes in Andhra Pradesh. A 50 m high, seven storied Rajagopuram was constructed on east entrance of the temple by Matla Anantaraja, a local chieftain. This structure has Ramayana scenes and portrait of Matla Anantaraja and his three wives carved onto the passage walls. Towards the west of Rajagopuram, there are two enclosures of the temple, arranged one behind the other. The outer enclosure hosts sub shrines of Pundarikavalli and Alvars. The inner enclosure hosts the main shrine of Govindaraja  along with shrines of Krishna with his consorts, Andal. Towards south west corner of the inner enclosure, there is a shrine dedicated to Kalyana Venkateswara which had a mandapa with finely finished colonettes on the outerpiers and with central space lined with yalis projecting inwards. The pavilion in the middle had columns of grey green granite and wooden roof.

Administration

The temple at present is being administered by Tirumala Tirupati Devasthanams.

Sub-Shrines
Sri Govindarajaswamy temple is a huge complex with many other sub shrines in it. Parthasarathy temple, Kalyana Venkateswara Temple are of more importance among the sub-shrines. There are also shrines dedicated to Pundarikavalli, Andal, Chakratalwar, Alvars, Lakshmi Narayana Swamy, Anjaneya, Tirumala Nambi, Bhashyakarla Swamy (Saint Ramanuja).

Parthasarathy Shrine

Kalyana Venkateswara Shrine

Gallery

See also
Hindu Temples in Tirupati
List of temples under Tirumala Tirupati Devasthanams
Govindaraja Perumal Temple, Chidambaram

References

External links
 

Hindu pilgrimage sites in India
Tirupati
Hindu temples in Tirupati district
Tirumala Tirupati Devasthanams
12th-century Hindu temples
Religious buildings and structures completed in 1130
Vishnu temples